Impero (Italian for "empire") may refer to:

Impero (river), stream in Liguria
Italian Empire, the colonial empire of Italy
Italian battleship Impero, warship of World War II
Cinema Impero, a movie theatre in Asmara, Eritrea
Imperial Line (Linea dell'Impero), air route of Italian Africa

See also
Imperial Italy (disambiguation)